Annulobalcis is a genus of medium-sized sea snails, marine gastropod molluscs in the family Eulimidae.

Species

There are eleven known species within the genus Annulobalcis:

 Annulobalcis albus Dgebuadze, Fedosov & Kantor, 2012
 Annulobalcis aurisflamma Simone & Martins, 1995
 Annulobalcis cicatricosa (Warén, 1981)
 Annulobalcis maculatus Dgebuadze, Fedosov & Kantor, 2012
 Annulobalcis marshalli Warén, 1981
 Annulobalcis pellucida (Turton, 1832)
 Annulobalcis procera Simone, 2002
 Annulobalcis shimazui Habe, 1965
 Annulobalcis vinarius Dgebuadze, Fedosov & Kantor, 2012
 Annulobalcis wareni Dgebuadze, Fedosov & Kantor, 2012
 Annulobalcis yamamotoi Habe, 1974
Species brought into synonymy
 Annulobalcis prionocidaricola Habe, 1974: synonym of  Trochostilifer straitus (Hedley, 1905)

References

 Warén A. (1984) A generic revision of the family Eulimidae (Gastropoda, Prosobranchia). Journal of Molluscan Studies suppl. 13: 1-96

External links
 To World Register of Marine Species

Eulimidae
Gastropod genera